The Boone History Center, previously known as the Champlin Memorial Masonic Temple,  is a historic building in Boone, Iowa. Constructed in 1907 as the Champlin Memorial Masonic Temple, the building housed Mt. Olive Lodge No. 79 (a local chapter of the Freemasons) until 1990 (when the lodge moved to a new building).  It now houses the Boone County Historical Society.

It was listed on the National Register of Historic Places in 1990.

References

External links
 Boone County Historical Center - official site

Masonic buildings completed in 1907
Clubhouses on the National Register of Historic Places in Iowa
National Register of Historic Places in Boone County, Iowa
Buildings and structures in Boone County, Iowa
Former Masonic buildings in Iowa
Museums in Boone County, Iowa
History museums in Iowa